Lockport Heights is a census-designated place (CDP) in Will County, Illinois, United States. It is in the northern part of the county and is bordered to the west, south, and east by the city of Lockport. Illinois Route 171 (Archer Avenue) runs along the northwest side of the CDP, leading southwest  to the center of Lockport and northeast  to the western edge of Chicago.

Lockport Heights was first listed as a CDP prior to the 2020 census.

Demographics

References 

Census-designated places in Will County, Illinois
Census-designated places in Illinois